Nao Ikeyama (born 18 September 1969) is a Japanese boxer who held the WBO atomweight title from 17 May 2014 until 29 July 2018. She made her professional debut on 30 November 2003, where she defeated Satoko Kamimura by unanimous decision. Ikeyama made six successful title defenses for her belt, with her sixth title defense coming against Saemi Hanagata on 12 July 2017. In 2015, Ikeyama participated in the first ever professional boxing event in Sri Lanka, where she defended her title against Jujeath Nagaowa.

Professional boxing record

References 

Living people
1969 births
Japanese women boxers
World Boxing Organization champions
Atomweight boxers